Dominique Sam Abouo (born 26 December 1973) is an Ivorian former professional footballer who played as a defender. He was a member of the Ivory Coast squad for the 1992, 1994, and 2000 Africa Cup of Nations.

External links

1973 births
Living people
Footballers from Abidjan
Association football defenders
Ivorian footballers
Ivory Coast international footballers
1992 African Cup of Nations players
2000 African Cup of Nations players
1994 African Cup of Nations players
Ivorian expatriate footballers
ASEC Mimosas players
AS Monaco FC players
K.S.K. Beveren players
Al Nassr FC players
K.S.C. Lokeren Oost-Vlaanderen players
Ivorian expatriate sportspeople in Monaco
Expatriate footballers in Monaco
Ivorian expatriate sportspeople in Turkey
Ivorian expatriate sportspeople in Saudi Arabia
Ivorian expatriate sportspeople in Belgium
Expatriate footballers in Saudi Arabia
Expatriate footballers in Turkey
Expatriate footballers in Belgium